Gary Spivey is a spiritual healer and psychic. He has made appearances on radio programs, TV shows, in live casino shows, and also conducts personal readings, seminars, workshops, and retreats.

Radio shows
Spivey regularly performs on morning radio shows. Current stations include shows in New York, Los Angeles (KYSR-FM), Chicago, San Francisco (KYLD-FM), Las Vegas (KLUC-FM), San Diego (XHRM-FM), Sacramento (KSFM-FM), Washington DC, Minneapolis (KDWB-FM), Miami, Milwaukee, (WMYX-FM), Nashville, Atlanta, KQRC 98.9 The Rock out of Kansas City Missouri, performing on the Johnny Dare Morning Show, as well as in Fort Myers, FL (WXKB-FM) on the Big Mama and the WiLD Bunch Morning Show. In the 1990s, Spivey was a sometime regular on the syndicated radio program The Ron & Ron Show, as well as hosting his own call in show which was owned and produced by The Ron & Ron Radio Network and broadcast on WSUN-AM in Tampa, Florida.

Appearances
Spivey has appeared on shows such as Entertainment Tonight, Hard Copy, The Ricki Lake Show, The Other Half, Inside Edition, Jeopardy!, Jimmy Kimmel Live!, and Jerry Springer.  He has also guest starred in A&E's Family Plots series and on World Championship Wrestling shows where he was scripted to be the mentor of "Mr. Wonderful" Paul Orndorff when the latter went through a period of self-doubt in his abilities after a series of losses. He has also been used in the 7-Eleven new Skittles flavour Slurpee ads in Australia.

Books
Gary Spivey's first book, co-authored with Dean Hymel was written in 2006 is titled Your Keys to Heaven – Secrets from God.

References

External links
Official website
Your Keys to Heaven - Secrets from God Official website

Living people
American psychics
American spiritual writers
American spiritual mediums
American faith healers
People from Montgomery County, North Carolina
Internet memes
Year of birth missing (living people)